Cummiskey is a surname. Notable people with the surname include:
Chris Cummiskey (born 1964), American politician from Arizona
David R. Cummiskey (born 1940), American politician
Edward Cummiskey (1954–1976), New York mobster who served as a mentor to Jimmy Coonan, leader of the Westies
Gary Cummiskey (born 1963), South African poet and publisher
Hugh Cummiskey (1789–1871), Irish-born settler of Lowell, Massachusetts, United States
James Cummiskey (1850–1925), Canadian merchant and political figure on Prince Edward Island, Canada